Exercise Talisman Sabre (also formerly spelled Talisman Saber, the US English alternative title) is a biennial, multinational military exercise led by Australia and the United States. Talisman Sabre involves joint exercises performed by the Australian Defence Force and the United States Military across six locations in northern and central Australia, the Coral Sea, and in Honolulu, Denver, and Suffolk, Va., though the bulk of the exercises are concentrated at the Shoalwater Bay Military Training Area and other locations in northern and central Australia and Australia's territorial sea and exclusive economic zone.

To reflect its bilateral nature, the leadership of the exercise switches between Australia and the US every 2 years. The exercise focuses on crisis-action planning and contingency response, enhancing both nations' military capabilities to deal with regional contingencies and the War on Terrorism. The exercise is historically held in odd-numbered years starting from 2005, with the ninth iteration taking place in 2021.

Annual exercises

Talisman Saber 2005 was the inaugural exercise in this series, conducted 12–27 June 2005, in Shoalwater Bay, Rockhampton, Townsville, and the Coral Sea, with 16,000 US and Australian troops. Planning for the exercises began in early 2003, and the exercise was meant to combine elements from previous exercises Tandem Thrust, Kingfisher, and Crocodile. During the exercise, U.S. Pacific Command and Australian Defence Force Joint Operations Command jointly executed more than 25 landing craft, air cushion (LCAC) trips and more than 1,300 Australian S-70A Blackhawk and MH-60S Knight Hawk landings and takeoffs.

Talisman Sabre 2007 involved 26,000 US and Australian troops over 10 June – 25 July. The exercise primarily took place at Shoalwater Bay, the Townsville Field Training Area, and the Bradshaw Field Training Area in central Queensland and in the Northern Territory. The exercise also involved the use of civilian airports including Sydney and Brisbane, and RAAF Base Amberley. A focal point of the exercises was a joint amphibious landing that involved the launch of more than 2,500 personnel from six ships early on 20 June.

Talisman Saber 2009 was conducted 6–25 July 2009, with 10,000 Australian land and naval forces and 20,000 U.S. troops. The exercise was led by the United States and was conducted primarily at Shoalwater Bay and the Townsville Field Training Area. It involved various amphibious assault exercises and ship defense exercises.

Talisman Sabre 2011 was conducted in July 2011 and was led by Australian forces. It incorporated "combined Special Forces operations, parachute drops, amphibious (marine) landings, land force maneuvers, urban and air operations and the coordinated firing of live ammunition."

Talisman Saber 2013 saw MV-22s deployed to Australia for the first time.

Talisman Sabre 2015 was conducted over 20 days from early to mid-July 2015 and involved up to 30,000 US and Australian troops. It was the largest combined military exercise undertaken by the Australian Defence Force (ADF). Defense forces from New Zealand (500 personnel) and Japan (40 personnel) joined the exercise for the first time this year. 
The activities took place in the North Australian Range Complex (Bradshaw and Mount Bundy Training Areas and Delamere Air Weapons Range) and the East Australian Range Complex (Shoalwater Bay, Townsville and Cowley Beach Training Areas). A large-scale amphibious landing was also conducted at Fog Bay in the Northern Territory.

Talisman Saber 2017 began in June 2017 and involved more than 33,000 Australian and US troops. Personnel from New Zealand, Japan, and Canada were embedded within Australian and United States units. Additionally, the Chinese Navy deployed a Type 815G Dongdiao-class electronic surveillance ship to monitor the exercise.

Talisman Sabre 2019 began in July 2019, with more than 34,000 personnel participating from 18 countries, including Australia, United States, Canada, Japan and New Zealand. The Exercise was officially launched on 8 July 2019 on board USS Ronald Reagan. Once again, the Chinese Navy sent a Type 815G Dongdiao-class ship, the Tianwangxing (Uranus), to monitor the exercise, and there was speculation that China had a "keen interest" in how Japan's vessels interacted with and operated alongside the ADF and the US forces. The F-35B also made its debut in Australia during the exercise aboard USS Wasp.

Talisman Saber 2021 was conducted in July 2021. The exercise was modified in scope and scale, with added health protection measures due to COVID-19 considerations. More than 17,000 personnel from Australia and the United States and forces from Canada, Japan, New Zealand, the Republic of Korea and the United Kingdom, while the Australia-based personnel from India, Indonesia, France and Germany observed the exercise. Additionally, MIM-104 Patriot Systems were tested in the exercise for the first time. For what was believed to be also the first time, the Chinese Navy deployed two Type 815 spy ships to observe the exercise: the Tianwangxing and her younger sister the Haiwangxing (Neptune).

Opposition and protests

There have been regular protests against the exercises since 2007.

There was opposition to Talisman Sabre 2007 from peace activists and a number of environmental groups, with environmental concerns ranging from general contamination to the purported damaging effects of sonar on local marine life. The Australian and American militaries have previously recognized the environmental concerns of operating in this area, with troops undergoing environmental impact briefings before arriving at the location in 2005, and an environmental training center to be constructed before the 2007 exercise.

In 2013 a number of protesters ventured into the live-fire zone of the Shoalwater Bay Training Area. More protestors pledged to disrupt the exercises in 2015.

Environmental concerns
There have been concerns that depleted uranium munitions, which have been linked to increased incidence of cancer, posing significant health risks, have been used at the Shoalwater Bay Military Training Area during Exercise Talisman Saber. Prior to the 2005 exercise, the Australian Department of Defence issued a press release which stated that depleted uranium "will not be used in TS05 by either Australian or US forces" and that this was "unequivocal". This commitment was reiterated prior to Talisman Saber 2009.

In 2013, the US Navy dropped at least two bombs into the sea after an exercise went wrong. Protesters claimed the bombs were hazardous to the Great Barrier Reef. The Australian government initially said the bombs were no threat and would remain where they were. But public pressure saw the US Navy retrieve the bombs.

See also
 Exercise Kangaroo
 Vostok 2010
 Vostok 2018

References

External links

 Exercise Talisman Sabre 2011, United States Department of Defense
 Exercise Talisman Sabre 2011, Australian Department of Defence
 Environment and US policy top global fears
 Forces involved in TS 07

Australian military exercises
Military exercises involving the United States
Australia–United States military relations